James Thompson House

 James S. Thompson House, New Boston, Illinois, listed on the NRHP in Mercer County, Illinois
 James Thompson House (Anchorage, Kentucky), listed on the NRHP in Kentucky
 James Young Thompson House, Amory, Mississippi, listed on the NRHP in Monroe County, Mississippi
 James Monroe Thompson House, Saxapahaw, North Carolina, listed on the NRHP in Alamance County, North Carolina

See also
Thompson House (disambiguation)